Arkadi Khachatryan (born 29 January 1975), is an Armenian politician, Member of the National Assembly of Armenia of Bright Armenia's faction.

References 

1975 births
Living people
21st-century Armenian politicians